The Dead Shall Dead Remain is the first album of the American death metal band Impaled.

Track listing 
Introduction - 01:26 
Fæces of Death - 04:10 	 
Flesh & Blood - 03:16 	  
Trocar - 05:31 	
Spirits of the Dead - 03:37 	  
Immaculate Defecation - 03:13 	  
Fæcal Rites - 03:49 	  
Back to the Grave - 04:45 	  
All That Rots - 03:51 	  
Gorenography - 04:55 	  
Blood Bath - 04:59
Untitled - 26:04

Impaled (band) albums
2000 albums